The Jean Baptiste Point Du Sable Homesite is the location where, around the 1780s, Jean Baptiste Point du Sable located his home and trading post. This home is generally considered to be the first permanent, non-native, residence in Chicago, Illinois.  The site of Point du Sable's home is now partially occupied by and commemorated in Pioneer Court at 401 N. Michigan Avenue in the Near North Side community area of Chicago, Illinois.

History
Point du Sable likely settled near the mouth of the Chicago River sometime around the 1780s and sold the property in 1800.  He lived here with his wife, Kitihawa, and children. The 1800 bill of sale was rediscovered in 1913 in an archive in Detroit, Michigan. The property included a house, two barns, a horse drawn mill, a bakehouse, a poultry house, a dairy, and a smokehouse. Their house was a  log cabin filled with fine furniture and paintings.

Following Point du Sable's departure from Chicago, the home became the property of John Kinzie. In 1834 the land owned by Kinzie was platted and sold. The "Kinzie addition" to Chicago, which is assumed to be coterminous with Point du Sable's estate extended from the banks of the Chicago River north to Chicago Avenue, and from State Street east to Lake Michigan.

Monument
A commemorative plaque, struck in 1937, was installed on a marble block at Pioneer Court after its 1965 dedication.  It reads, "KINZIE MANSION / Near this site stood Kinzie Mansion, / 1784-1832, home of Pointe Du Saible, / Le Mai, and John Kinzie, Chicago's / "first civilian," here was born in 1805, / the city's first white child Ellen Marion Kinzie".  While the plaque is correct that Ellen Marion Kinzie was the first white child born in the city, Du Sable's granddaughter, Eulalie Pelletier, was the first non-native to be born in the city, in 1796.

Pioneer Court was listed on the National Register of Historic Places and listed as a National Historic Landmark on May 11, 1976. At this site in 2009 the City of Chicago and a private donor erected a large bronze bust of Point duSable by Chicago-born sculptor Erik Blome. In October 2010 the adjacent Michigan Avenue Bridge was renamed DuSable Bridge in honor of Point duSable.

See also
List of National Historic Landmarks in Illinois
National Register of Historic Places listings in North Side Chicago

Notes

National Historic Landmarks in Chicago
National Register of Historic Places in Chicago
African-American Roman Catholicism